The Khmer Krom (or 'Southern Khmer people') are ethnically Khmer people living in or from the region of Tây Nam Bộ, the south western part of Vietnam.

In Khmer, Krom means 'low' or 'below'. It is added to differentiate from the Khmers in Cambodia. Most Khmer Krom live in Tây Nam Bộ, the southern lowland region of historical Cambodia covering an area of  around modern day Ho Chi Minh City and the Mekong Delta, which used to be the southeasternmost territory of the Khmer Empire until its incorporation into Vietnam under the Nguyễn lords in the early 18th century. This marks the final stage of the Vietnamese "March to the South" (Nam tiến).

Khmer Krom people have been members of the Unrepresented Nations and Peoples Organization (UNPO) since 15 July 2001.

According to the US-based Human Rights Watch (HRW) "the Khmer Krom people face serious restrictions of freedom of expression, assembly, association, information, and movement".

Demographics
The majority of Khmer Krom live in Southern Vietnam. According to Vietnamese government figures (2009 census), there are 1,260,640 Khmer Krom in Vietnam. Other estimates vary considerably, with at least 10 million (consistent with the data from Khmer Kampuchea-Krom Federation) to over ten million, reported in Taylor (2014) in his The Khmer lands of Vietnam.

A significant number of Khmer Krom also fled to Cambodia, estimated at 1.20 million by one source.

In other parts of the world, there are approximately 40,000 Khmer Krom emigrants notably in the United States (30,000), France (3,000), Australia (1,000), Canada (500). Khmer Krom emigrant communities in the US are located near Philadelphia, Pennsylvania, and in Washington state.

Origins

The Khmer Krom identify ethnically with the Khmer people who constitute a distinct people at least since the late eighth century and the foundation of the Khmer Empire by Jayavarman II in 802 C.E. They retain deep linguistic, religious, customary and cultural links to Cambodia proper. The Mekong Delta region constituted for more than 800 years an integral part of the empire and the subsequent kingdom. The region's economic center was the city of Prey Nokor, now Ho Chi Minh City.

History

Absorption of the Mekong Delta by Vietnam

In the 17th century a weakened Khmer state left the Mekong Delta poorly administered after repeated warfare with Siam. Concurrently Vietnamese refugees fleeing the Trịnh–Nguyễn War in Vietnam migrated into the area. In 1623 Cambodian king Chey Chettha II (1618–1628) officially sanctioned the Vietnamese immigrants to operate a custom house at Prey Nokor, then a small fishing village. The settlement steadily grew soon becoming a major regional port, attracting even more settlers.

In 1698 the Nguyễn Lords of Huế commissioned Nguyễn Hữu Cảnh, a Vietnamese noble to organize the territory along Vietnamese administrative lines, thus by de facto detaching it from the Kingdom of Cambodia and incorporating it into Vietnam.

With the loss of the port of Prey Nokor, then renamed Saigon, Cambodia's control of the area grew increasingly tenuous while increasing waves of Vietnamese settlers to the Delta isolated the Khmer of the Mekong Delta from the Cambodian kingdom. By 1757 the Vietnamese had absorbed the provinces of Psar Dèk (renamed Sa Đéc in Vietnamese) on the Mekong itself, and Moat Chrouk (Vietnamized to Châu Đốc) on the Bassac River.

Minh Mạng enacted assimilation policies upon the Khmer such as forcing them to adopt Sino-Vietnamese surnames, culture, and clothing. Minh Mang sinicized ethnic minorities including the Cambodians, in line with Confucianism as he diffused Vietnamese culture with China's Han civilization using the term Han people 漢人 for the Vietnamese. Minh Mang declared that "We must hope that their barbarian habits will be subconsciously dissipated, and that they will daily become more infected by Han [Sino-Vietnamese] customs." These policies were directed at the Khmer and hill tribes.

Separatist movements
Khmer nationalist Son Ngoc Thanh (1908–77) was a Khmer krom, born in Trà Vinh, Vietnam. Thanh was active in the independence movement for Cambodia. With Japanese support he became the prime minister of Cambodia in March 1945 but was then quickly ousted with the return of the French later that year. Widely supported by the Khmer Krom during the First Indochina War, Thanh's role faded in Vietnam after 1954 as he became more embroiled with politics in Cambodia proper, forming an opposition movement against Prince Sihanouk.

During the Vietnam War and direct American involvement between 1964 and 1974, the Khmer Krom were recruited by the United States Armed Forces to serve in MIKE Force. The force fought on the side of South Vietnam against the Viet Cong but in time the militia regrouped as the "Front for the Struggle of Kampuchea Krom". Headed by a Khmer Krom Buddhist monk, Samouk Sen, the group was nicknamed the "White Scarves" and allied itself with FULRO against South Vietnam. FULRO was an alliance of Khmer Krom, Montagnard, and Cham groups.

The anti-Communist prime minister of the Khmer Republic (1970 - 1975) Lon Nol planned to recapture the Mekong Delta from South Vietnam.

After the Fall of Saigon in 1975 and the Communist take-over of all of Vietnam, the Kampuchea Krom militia found itself embattled with People's Army of Vietnam. Many of the fighters fled to Khmer Rouge-controlled Democratic Kampuchea hoping to find a safe haven to launch their operations inside Vietnam. The "White Scarves" arrived in Kiri Vong District in 1976, making overture to the Khmer Rouge and appealing to the leader Khieu Samphan directly for assistance. The force was disarmed and welcomed initially. Subsequent orders from the Khmer Rouge leadership however had Samouk Sen arrested, taken to Phnom Penh, tortured, and killed. His force of 67 Khmer Krom fighters were all massacred. During the following months, some 2,000 "White Scarves" fighters crossing into Kampuchea were systematically killed by the Khmer Rouge.

In the late 1970s, the Kampuchean Revolutionary Army attacked Vietnam in an attempt to reconquer the areas which were formerly part of the Khmer Empire, but this military adventure was a total disaster and precipitated the invasion of Democratic Kampuchea by the People's Army of Vietnam and subsequent downfall of the Khmer Rouge, with Vietnam occupying Kampuchea.

Human rights

Many independent NGOs report that the human rights of the Khmer Krom are being violated by the Vietnamese government. Khmer Krom are reportedly forced to adopt Vietnamese family names and speak the Vietnamese language. As well, the Vietnamese government has cracked down on non-violent demonstrations by the Khmer Krom.

Unlike some other minority people groups in Vietnam, the Khmer Krom are largely unknown by the Western world, despite efforts by associations of exiled Khmer Krom such as the Khmers Kampuchea-Krom Federation to publicize their plight with the Unrepresented Nations and Peoples Organisation. No Western government has yet raised the matter of the Khmer Krom's human rights with the Vietnamese government.

The "Human Rights Council Universal Periodic Review Working Group" was visited by the Khmer Kampuchea Krom Federation.

Notable people

Chau Sen Cocsal Chhum, Prime Minister of Cambodia (1962) 
Ieng Sary, Khmer Rouge member and Minister of Foreign Affairs of Democratic Kampuchea
Son Ngoc Minh, co-founder of the Communist Party of Kampuchea 
Son Ngoc Thanh, Prime Minister of Cambodia (1945) and the Khmer Republic (1972) 
Son Sen, Khmer Rouge member and Minister of National Defence of Democratic Kampuchea 
Tou Samouth, co-founder and General Secretary of the Communist Party of Kampuchea (1951–1962)

See also
 Kampuchea Krom
 Khmer people
 History of Cambodia
 Cochinchina

References

External links

 Khmers Kampuchea-Krom Federation (KKF)
 Khmer Krom news and information network
 Khmer Krom news and information in Khmer language
 Khmer Krom: A Royal Solution for a Nationalist Vietnam reported by Unrepresented Nations and Peoples Organisation
  Video clips of Rebecca Sommer's film "Eliminated without Bleeding" documenting human rights violation claims of the Khmer Krom in Vietnam
 March 2007- Article on religious oppression by Vietnam

Ethnic groups in Cambodia
Ethnic groups in Vietnam
Ethnic minorities

Indigenous peoples of Southeast Asia
Ethnic groups in Southeast Asia
Khmer people
Social history of Cambodia